Rachel Clare Hirst married name Rachel Stanhope (born 4 March 1965) is a former British rower who won a silver medal at the 1989 World Rowing Championships in Bled, in the lightweight coxless four event and competed at the 1992 Summer Olympics.

Rowing career
She won the single sculls title rowing for Trent Polytechnic, at the 1986 National Championships and the following year she repeated the success but this time rowing for the Nottinghamshire County Rowing Association. In 1989 she won the coxed four and lightweight coxless four national titles at the 1989 National Championships. and won a silver medal at the 1989 World Rowing Championships in Bled.

She was selected to represent Great Britain in the women's eight event at the 1992 Olympic Games in Barcelona. The team which consisted of Hirst, Fiona Freckleton, Philippa Cross, Dot Blackie, Susan Smith, Kate Grose, Kareen Marwick, Katharine Brownlow and Alison Paterson finished in seventh place.

References

External links
 

1965 births
Living people
British female rowers
Olympic rowers of Great Britain
Rowers at the 1992 Summer Olympics
Sportspeople from Cheltenham